Welspun Investments and Commercials Ltd (|) (formally Welspun Investments Ltd) is Indian investment and financial service provider company based in Mumbai, Maharashtra. It was founded in 2008 after merging Welspun Trading Ltd, Welspun Finance Ltd and Krishiraj Trading Ltd in one company. It is a part of the  Welspun Group.

References

External links
Welspun India to de-merge its marketing and investment division
Welspun India spins off wings into separate firms
Welspun India gets High Court nod for demerger of divisions

Financial services companies based in Mumbai
Welspun Group
Financial services companies established in 2008
Investment companies of India
Indian companies established in 2008
2008 establishments in Maharashtra
Companies listed on the National Stock Exchange of India
Companies listed on the Bombay Stock Exchange